Spanish singer Melody has released six studio albums and about 20 singles.

Studio albums

Extended plays

Promotional EPs

Singles 

 [A] from the 2015 Spanish film It's Now or Never

Remix singles 

 For chart positions, see "Singles".

Promotional singles

Collaboration singles

Music videos

References 

Pop music discographies
Latin pop music discographies
Discographies of Spanish artists